PAR2 may refer to:

 Parchive, an error correction system for computer files. The second version is known as PAR2.
 Protease activated receptor 2, a G-protein coupled receptor protein
 PAR2, one of the pseudoautosomal regions of the X and Y chromosomes